is Japanese anime series by Soeisha (later renamed as Sunrise), which premiered in Japan on Fuji TV from April 4, 1975 and finished its run on December 26, 1975, spanning a total of 39 episodes. The title translates to English as "The Star of the Seine" or "The Seine's Star".  It is based on Alain Delon's 1963 movie La Tulipe noire (which, in spite of the title, is based, in name only, on Alexandre Dumas, père's novel The Black Tulip).

It was created by Mitsuru Kaneko, and was directed by Masaaki Ōsumi (episodes 1-26) and Yoshiyuki Tomino (episodes 27-39). It was written by Sōji Yoshikawa, while the character designer was Akio Sugino. The music for the series was composed by Shunsuke Kikuchi.

Plot

The story is set in Paris, on the eve of the French Revolution. The civilians have been suffering under the tyrannical rule of Louis XVI. In order to release the people from their suffering, Simone, a young girl whose parents were killed by the aristocrats, decides to challenge the corrupted aristocrats. Covering her face with a red mask and leaving a red carnation as a mark of her presence, Simone is La Seine no Hoshi.

Staff
Original Creator: Emukei (Mitsuru Kaneko)
Chief Director: Masaaki Ōsumi (episodes 1-26)
Assistant Director, Episode Director and Storyboards: Tetsu Dezaki
Supervising Director:  Masaaki Ōsumi (episodes 27-39)
Director: Yoshiyuki Tomino (episodes 27-39)
Screenplay: Sōji Yoshikawa
Character Design: Akio Sugino
Animation Directors: Mitsuo Shindō, Hisashi Sakaguchi
Music: Shunsuke Kikuchi
Music Performers: Mitsuko Horie, Otowa Yurikago Kai, Koorogi '73 and others

Cast
Simone/La Seine no Hoshi: Terumi Niki
Robert de Forge/Black Tulip: Taichirō Hirokawa
Danton: Masako Nozawa (a possible reference to Georges Danton)
Zarar: Kiyoshi Kobayashi
Duke de Forge: Mikio Terashima
Marie-Antoinette, Queen of France: Reiko Mutō
Louis XVI, King of France: Osamu Saka
Prince Louis Charles: Yoneko Matsukane
Princess Marie Therese: Kazue Komiya
Burierre: Yūji Fujishiro
Francis, Holy Roman Emperor: Kōhei Miyauchi
Hans Kaunitz: Masashi Amenomori
Michelle: Yōko Asagami
Crojaille: Shigeyuki Hosokawa
Catherine: Noriko Ohara
Guibon: Mahito Tsujimura
Duke of Orléans: Michihiro Ikemizu
Milan: Kei Tomiyama
François: Yumi Nakatani
Riyon: Eken Mine
Charlotte: Kazuko Sugiyama
Angélique: Rihoko Yoshida
Choureau: Sanji Hase
Papa: Kōichi Kitamura
Mama: Ayako Tsuboi
Marquess de Moralle: Jōji Yanami
Narrator: Taichirō Hirokawa

External links

1975 anime television series debuts
Drama anime and manga
Shunsuke Kikuchi
Fuji TV original programming
Sunrise (company)
Television series set in the French Revolution
Television shows set in Paris
Animated television shows based on films